The Estero Los Litres or Estero El Melón is an estuary of Chile that crosses the Valparaíso Region and disembogues in the Aconcagua River.

See also
List of rivers of Chile

References

Rivers of Chile
Rivers of Valparaíso Region